The Kräuterin is a karst massif with a size of 10 km by 12 km, located in the Ybbstal Alps, Austria. Its highest peak is the Hochstadl, at 1919 meters above sea level.

Mountain ranges of Styria
Karst